Tourville was a  74-gun ship of the line of the French Navy.

Career 

In 1790, she was under Armand de Saint-Félix.

In August 1793, she was damaged by a tempest, which also killed her captain, and had to return to Brest. In September, a mutiny broke out aboard. She took part in the Bataille du 13 prairial an 2, to the Expédition d'Irlande, and to the Cruise of Bruix. She was eventually broken up in Brest in 1841.

Sources and references 
 Notes

References

 Bibliography
 

External links
 Ships of the line

Ships of the line of the French Navy
Téméraire-class ships of the line
1788 ships